"That's All She Wrote" is a country song written by Jerry Fuller. It was recorded in 1964 by Ernest Tubb on his album Thanks a Lot. In 1976 it was a No.34 single for Ray Price. The song has been covered by various other artists including Johnny Mathis on Feelings (1975), and by T. G. Sheppard in 1978.

References

Songs written by Jerry Fuller
1976 singles
1964 songs